The HKGolden (Hong Kong Golden Forum) is an Internet forum for topics related to computer hardware and software among Internet users in Hong Kong in the early 2000s. HKGolden has become an Internet community. The forum is a part of HKGolden.com, a computer information portal named after the Golden Computer Centre – a shopping centre of computer products in Sham Shui Po, Kowloon, Hong Kong. Since 2006, it has become a popular and general platform for all Hong Kong netizen. It was the concentration platform of funny and satirical derivative works. However, due to the poor management of the administrators, many users have left in 2016.

Access to the website is blocked to users in the Chinese Mainland by the Great Firewall of China.

History 
In the late 1990s, due to the popularity of the Internet, competition drove stores online. In an effort to protect consumers, the traders' association of the Golden Computer Centre launched the website with information about computer hardware and software prices, thus increasing the transparency of the marketplace. 

In the early 2000s, a discussion forum was launched to complement the website. It was originally open in structure and without topic demarcation, and destined for computing matters. Very soon, its topics became broader-based, the discussion area segregated into "computing" and "chill" areas, each with their own topics or "stations". On-line discussion groups formed. The community, formed by ordinary citizens as well as computer geeks, would be interested in all manner of local topics. In the course of discussions, slang would be widely employed. Neologisms would often develop, and these would quickly pass virally into colloquial usage. Users are called "Golden boys" (高登仔), and users call each other "brother" (巴打) and "sister" (絲打).

Topics are themed by hobby groups, and include 'Movies', 'Photography', 'Motoring',  'Music', 'Finance', 'Sport', 'Political' , etc. Although the name "Hong Kong Golden Forum" applies to the whole, this name is now usually synonymous with the "Off-topic station" within the forum due to its runaway popularity. At one time, forum members formed themselves into registered cliques, the most prominent ones being "Big mouth" and "DIY". HKGolden has become an influential media from which topics and exclusive news are frequently being reported on magazine and newspaper. Many people believe that reporters, police and even government may be active in the forum to investigate popular culture and public opinion.

In 2003, the website was sold to Fevaworks by the owner. In July 2003, the database was severely corrupted following a hacking incident, and the website had to be closed for maintenance until 25 August of that year, when the forum was once again re-opened.

Since the incident, a number of changes were instigated:
membership category simplified to 2 types – "ordinary" and "premium"
ordinary members are allowed to create only 5 threads per day; no limit for premium members
in exchange for extra privileges, premium members have to submit proofs of identity and address
dismantling of the registered cliques
membership is now free

The forum still repeatedly suffers from hacking; the last provoked stoppage occurred on 8 September 2006.

On 2009, the forum leaked a six-minute detailed video involving teenage prostitution on a double-decker bus for HK$200 to raise money for designer handbag. This led to local police launching a criminal investigation.

In Hong Kong, it was reported that HKGolden was the most visited place for technology brand related discussions with 87,291 posts in a single discussion channel within three months. Twitter remained as second destination with 27,236 posts. The local Eyny Forum followed with 8,683 posts. Yahoo! HK forum was at fourth with 7,538 posts. 
As of 2019 March, HKGolden is the 12th top site in Hong Kong, according to Alexa.com.

See also
Hong Kong Discuss Forum
Internet vigilantism
Anonymous
LIHKG Forum

References

External links
Golden Forum 
HKGolden.com 

Internet forums in Hong Kong